The Bildindex der Kunst und Architektur is an open online database of 2.2 million photographs of 1.7 million artworks and architectural objects. The owner/operator of this database is the German Documentation Center for Art History known formally as Bildarchiv Foto Marburg.

In addition to its own image holdings, around 1 million images from 50 partner institutions are also available online. Not all images are of German objects. In 1976 the institution purchased thousands of photographs of the Du magazine of the Swiss publishing house Conzett & Huber.

Between 1977 and 2008, 1.4 million photographs from 15 different institutions were made available on microfiche by Bildarchiv Foto Marburg as the "Marburger Index - the list of art in Germany". Published digital reproductions of these microfiche photographs from the original partner institutions now form the basis of the image index.

References

Further reading 
 Photographs, Microfiches, MIDAS, and DISKUS: The Bildarchiv Foto Marburg as German Center for the Documentation of Art History, by Fritz Laupichler, 1996

External links 

 Image Index of Art and Architecture

Art history
Open-access archives
Photo archives in Germany